Kuby may refer to:

Adam Kuby (born 1961), American artist
Clemens Kuby (born 1947), German documentary writer and film maker
Erich Kuby (1910–2005), German journalist, publisher and screenwriter 
Gabriele Kuby (born 1944), German writer and sociologist
Patrick Kuby, fictional character; see 
Ron Kuby (born 1956), American lawyer, radio talk show, host and television commentator

See also
Kuby-Młyny, a village in Poland